"Life in One Day" is the third single from Howard Jones' 1985 album Dream Into Action. It is an uptempo number, which lyrically warns against wishing one's life away. It reached number 14 in the UK Singles Chart, and number 19 on the United States Billboard Hot 100.

The 12" version features a pair of remixes of the lead track which were more obviously different in structure from the original than was the norm on Jones' previous releases. Part One is a vocal mix, and Part Two a largely instrumental dub mix.

The UK B-side, "Boom Bap Respite", a piano instrumental, was not included in the US release. Instead the song was coupled with "Learning How to Love", a song previously available the UK on the single "Look Mama".

Track listing
7"
"Life in One Day" – 3:40
"Boom Bap Respite" – 2:48

7" Limited Edition
"Life in One Day" – 3:40
"Boom Bap Respite" – 2:48
"Always Asking Questions (Live at the Manchester Apollo)"
"New Song (Live at the Manchester Apollo)"

7" (US Single)
"Life in One Day"
"Learning How To Love"

Released as a twinpack in a gatefold sleeve.

12"
"Life in One Day (Part One)" – 6:48
"Life in One Day (Part Two)" – 7:10
"Boom Bap Respite" – 2:48

Other versions
Jones, along with Afrodiziak who contributed backing vocals on the original, performed "Life in One Day" live in an a cappella style at the Shaftesbury Theatre in London as part of a series of music/alternative comedy shows held in April 1986 by the charity Comic Relief. A recording of this performance was issued later on the album Utterly Utterly Live.

Played by Jones on grand piano accompanied only by a percussionist, the song appeared on the 1996 album Live Acoustic America.

An entirely re-recorded version featuring Jones' touring band at the time was included on the limited edition 2000 studio album Pefawm.

Another live rendition appeared on the 2007 album Live in Birkenhead, this time performed on piano and guitar.

Video
A promotional video to accompany the song was produced by Godley & Creme. It featured Jones in a variety of roles, sometimes so heavily disguised as to be barely recognizable. It parodied a variety of television adverts and programmes in a series of vignettes, interrupted by visual effects simulating poor television reception and other similar faults.

References

External links
The Official Howard Jones Website Discography
Utterly Utterly Live Comic Relief album track listing, cast and production credits
[ Allmusic.com – Life In One Day] 
Everyhit.com Top 40 singles artist search

1985 singles
Howard Jones (English musician) songs
Songs written by Howard Jones (English musician)
Song recordings produced by Rupert Hine
1985 songs
Warner Music Group singles